Gurdūārā Sāhib Pātshāhī Chhevī is a gurdwara or Sikh temple situated in the village of Khurāṇā in the district of Sangrur in the Indian state of Punjab. It dedicated to the Sikh Guru Hargobind who visited the village in 1618 CE. The gurdwara is housed in a small square, domed hall in the middle of a low walled compound. It is a scheduled gurdwara under the Shiromani Gurdwara Prabandhak Committee and is administered through the manager of Nānakīānā Sāhib assisted by a committee of the local sangat.

Gurdwaras in Punjab, India